KFEL (970 AM) is a radio station broadcasting a Catholic radio format. Licensed to Pueblo, Colorado, United States, it serves the Colorado Springs and Pueblo areas. The station is currently owned by Kansas City Catholic Network, Inc.

External links
FCC History Cards for KFEL

Catholic radio stations
FEL
FEL
Radio stations established in 1956
1956 establishments in Colorado